Deogratias "Deo" Niyizonkiza is a Burundian-born American who founded and leads the organization Village Health Works in Kigutu, Burundi. He is also the subject of Tracy Kidder's 2009 book, Strength in What Remains. Niyizonkiza escaped the Burundi's Civil War in the 1990s, arrived in New York city, became homeless and was eventually taken in by an American couple who helped support his education at Columbia University. He began working for Partners in Health and has worked in Burundi and Rwanda. He started a health clinic in his parents' community in Burundi which he continues to lead.

Niyizonkiza has been the recipient of several awards, including the 2016 Carnegie Corporation of New York Great Immigrants.

References

Burundian activists
Burundian expatriates in the United States
Year of birth missing (living people)
Living people
Columbia University alumni
Geisel School of Medicine alumni
Harvard School of Public Health alumni